Dr. Hariharan Chandrashekar is an Indian ecological economist, founding and presiding over urban people-led movements for urban sustainability on water and energy, a mentor for green enterprise and entrepreneurs, and enabler of industry directions on sustainability and resilience, at the building scale and the city scale.   

His current preoccupation has been with the pioneering citizen action initiative, WOW Action Forum and the multi-city WOW Partner City Network that spans cities across South Asia, Africa and the Americas to help citizens and bulk water-users adopt local solutions for water efficiency. The WOW Mission also extends to encouraging and driving public demonstration activity for inspiring water and energy conservation among lay Water-users. WOW is a citizen-led action for demand-side water management with voluntary compliance and solutioning sustainable options for saving water, money, energy and carbon.   

He mentors green leadership Programmes for Indian industry and academia under the umbrella of SAANSS and Foundation Green. He is also driving a series of Sustainability Peer Reviews for projects that aspire to go deep green with Net Zero Water and Energy guidelines.

Career
Over three decades he has led many enterprise initiatives to promote and mainstream sustainability businesses with green and resilient homes under the banner of ZED Homes that he founded and nurtured for over 22 years. In recent years at the AltTech Foundation the mission is clearly to accelerate sustainability directions across the board in industry, residential and commercial sectors of urban India. 

Hariharan is the founder of Biodiversity Conservation India Limited, a builder of environmentally friendly homes, and of AltTech Foundation, which focuses on zero energy development and low-Carbon development and Deep Decarbonisation strategies for buildings. 

He also curates and anchors a series of online education and policy dialogues under the Prem Jain Memorial Trust, and INHAF India. He is working to create over 250,000 jobs in India in collaboration with the CII, the Institute of Logistics, and the Government of Karnataka's Department of Technical Education. 

Between 1991 and 2015, he helped launch and nurture three national environment-related Trusts, and six companies working in green residential buildings and the production of green products.

In 1991, he founded the Academy for Mountain Environics [now the Environics Trust]. This organization works on traditional rights of people Impacted by excessive natural exploitation. In 1994, he founded Biodiversity Conservation India Limited and stepped down in 2017 to make way for new leadership. The company creates homes with deep Eco-directions for materials, and use/reuse of water, energy, and waste. In 2004, Hariharan established the AltTech Foundation (ATF), a not-for-profit organization working on energy and water solutions. Since 2018, the Foundation has worked on retrofitting a few chosen existing buildings in India to heighten Energy Efficiency.

Between 2012 and 2013, Hariharan served as technical advisor for the Karnataka Urban Water Supply & Sewerage Board. He also worked as a sustainability advisor for Bengaluru Central University in Bangalore.

He has been an itinerant resource leader for the World Resources Institute, Les Ateliers Maitrise d’Oeuvres Urbaine, ADEME, and UN Habitat.

He has consulted for the governments of Uttaranchal, Kerala and Nagaland on eco-tourism infrastructure and environment policies. He has also served as consultant for urban water supply and sanitation development as well as on practices for promoting energy efficiency in buildings and in cities, for a number of Indian and global development organizations.

He writes occasionally in national dailies and e-media on how consumers can go green at minimal cost.

Memberships and advisory 

 Founder member and Senior Fellow of the CII India Green Business Council national executive committee.
 Partner for the Canada India Center Carleton Univ. at Ottawa.
 Lead resource person for the Centre of Excellence for Sustainable Futures of the Govt. of Karnataka
 Editorial Advisory member, Society for Energy Engineers and Managers.

References- 

20th-century Indian economists